Elena Bogdan and Mihaela Buzărnescu were the defending champions, but both players chose not to participate.

Réka-Luca Jani and Christina Shakovets won the title, defeating Ekaterina Dzehalevich and Oksana Kalashnikova in the final, 3–6, 6–4, [10–6].

Seeds

Draw

References 
 Main draw

Telavi Open - Doubles
2012 in Georgian sport
Telavi Open